Idit Zehavi (born 1969) is an Israeli astrophysicist and researcher who discovered an anomaly in the mapping of the cosmos, which offered insight into how the universe is expanding. She is part of the team completing the Sloan Digital Sky Survey and is one of the world's most highly cited scientists according to the list published annually by Thomson Reuters.

Biography 
Idit Zehavi was born in Israel in 1969 and completed her education in Jerusalem, earning a PhD from the Racah Institute of Physics at the Hebrew University of Jerusalem in 1998. The findings were independently noted by another researcher, Adam Riess, from the University of California, Berkeley. Soon after, Zehavi moved to the United States to complete her post-doctorate studies in galaxy clustering at the University of Chicago and participate in research at the Fermi National Accelerator Laboratory. She left Fermilab in 2004 for the University of Arizona and continued working on the research of the Sloan Digital Sky Survey (SDSS). In 2005, she participated in research under the direction of Daniel Eisenstein, which detected "cosmic ripples", which confirmed the cosmological theory of the creation of the universe.

In 2006, she joined Case Western Reserve University of Cleveland, Ohio, as an Associate Professor in the Astronomy Department. In 2009, Zehavi was awarded a grant from the U.S. National Science Foundation to continue her work with the SDSS to expand her work on galaxy clustering to encompass a larger scale view of the universe. According to the annual listing produced by Thomson Reuters, Zehavi is one of the world's most highly cited scientists.

Selected works

References

External links 
WorldCat Publications

1969 births
Living people
Israeli women scientists
Israeli astronomers
Women astronomers
Hebrew University of Jerusalem alumni
21st-century women scientists